Grace, in comics, may refer to:
 Grace Choi, a DC Comics character
 Grace (Dark Horse Comics), a Dark Horse Comics superhero
 Grace (Marvel Comics), a Marvel Comics character and member of the New Warriors
 Grace Holloway, a Dr Who companion who has appeared in Doctor Who Monthly
 Grace Guinness, a character from Checkmate
 Gamora's Graces, a group of characters who appeared in the Annihilation storyline

It may also refer to:
 Amazing Grace (comics), a DC Comics supervillain
 Karin Grace, a DC Comics character
 Francesca Grace, a Marvel UK character who appeared in titles like Knights of Pendragon

See also
 Grace (disambiguation)

References